Rumpelstiltskin Grinder (or RsG) was a crossover thrash band from the U.S. state of Pennsylvania. They first released their live album "Raped by Bears". After that they released a single song split 7-inch entitled "Equipment Crusher" with Jumbo's Kill Crane on Red Candle Records. They then released a live CD-R entitled Raped By Bears-Live At The Dungeon 6/21/03. Their debut album Buried In The Front Yard was released on Relapse Records. Their second album entitled Living for Death, Destroying the Rest was released in January 2009. RsG played their first North American tour that year.

Members 
Current members:
Melissa Moore (Rhythm Guitar, Vocals) (XXX Maniak)
Shawn Riley (Bass, Vocals)
Pat Battaglia (Drums, Percussion)
Ryan Moll (Lead Guitar)

Former members
Eli Shaika (Vocals)
Mike Hrubovcak (Vocals)
Jason Sidote (Vocals)

Rumpelstiltskin Grinder contains former members of the now defunct American black metal acts Solace in the Shadows and Evil Divine.

Discography

Studio albums
 Buried in the Front Yard (2005) Jason P Gross Guest Guitar and Promo 2005 to 2006 worked with Schroud and Spinecast...
 Living for Death, Destroying the Rest (2009)
 Ghostmaker (2012)

Live albums
 "Raped by Bears" (2003)

Split albums
 "Jumbo's Killcrane / Rumpelstiltskin Grinder" (2004)
 "Speed n' Spikes Vol. II" (2008)
 "Urine Trouble / Nothing Defeats the Skull" (2008)
 "Jason Gross / Guitar Rumplestiltskin Grinder" (2004)

Videography
Stealing E.T. (Music Video) (2006)
Nothing Defeats the Skull (Music Video) (2009)

External links
http://www.rumpelstiltskingrinder.com/
http://candlelightrecordsusa.com/site/
http://www.relapse.com/
Rumpelstiltskin Grinder on Myspace
Living for Death

Musical groups established in 2002
Heavy metal musical groups from Pennsylvania
Relapse Records artists
American grindcore musical groups
Musical groups from Philadelphia
2002 establishments in Pennsylvania